Association of University Presses of Latin America and the Caribbean, often referred to as EULAC, is an association of university presses located in South America and the Caribbean. The association also maintains the Latin American University Presses Rights Catalog, which records and publicizes academic works published by South American and Caribbean presses.

See also

 List of university presses

References

External links
EULAC Homepage
The Latin American University Presses Rights Catalog
Presses by Country

Publishing-related professional associations
Academic publishing
Scholarly communication
University presses
Latin America and the Caribbean